The 1996 Skate America was the first event of six in the 1996–97 ISU Champions Series, a senior-level international invitational competition series. It was held at the Springfield Civic Center in Springfield, Massachusetts on October 31 – November 3. Medals were awarded in the disciplines of men's singles, ladies' singles, pair skating, and ice dancing. Skaters earned points towards qualifying for the 1996–97 Champions Series Final.

Results

Men

Ladies

Pairs

Ice dancing

References

External links
 1996 Skate America

Skate America, 1996
Skate America